José Ulises Macías Salcedo, Archbishop emeritus of the Archdiocese of Hermosillo, was born in León, Guanajuato, Mexico, on October 29, 1940.

He studied Humanities in the Seminary of his native city, and studied philosophy and theology at the Pontifical Gregorian University in Rome, where later received a Licentiate in Philosophy.

He was then ordained a priest in León, Guanajuato, on April 10, 1966.

Named bishop for the Diocese of Mexicali by Pope John Paul II, on 16 June 1984, and consecrated on 29 July, in the city of Mexicali, presided over by Apostolic Delegate Archbishop Girolamo Prigione.

Pope John Paul II named him the third Archbishop of the Archdiocese of Hermosillo on August 19, 1996, and he took possession on 29 October of the same year.

He retired in 2016.

References
Archdiocese of Hermosillo biography
Catholic-Hierarchy.net data

1940 births
Living people
20th-century Roman Catholic archbishops in Mexico
21st-century Roman Catholic archbishops in Mexico
People from León, Guanajuato
Mexican expatriates in Italy